The men's long jump at the 2010 IAAF World Indoor Championships was held at the ASPIRE Dome on 12 and 13 March.

Medalists

Records

Qualification standards

Schedule

Results

Qualification
Qualification: Qualifying Performance 8.00 (Q) or at least 8 best performers (q) advance to the final.

Final

References
Qualification Results
Final Result

Long jump
Long jump at the World Athletics Indoor Championships